Stefano Pantano (born 4 May 1962) is an Italian fencer. He competed in the épée events at the 1988 and 1992 Summer Olympics.

References

1962 births
Living people
Italian male fencers
Olympic fencers of Italy
Fencers at the 1988 Summer Olympics
Fencers at the 1992 Summer Olympics
Universiade medalists in fencing
Universiade silver medalists for Italy
Medalists at the 1987 Summer Universiade